Accomac (YTB-812) was a United States Navy  named for Accomac, Virginia.

Construction

The contract for Accomac was awarded 22 June 1970. She was laid down on 12 January 1971 at Sturgeon Bay, Wisconsin, by Peterson Builders and launched 8 June 1971.

Operational history

Delivered to the Navy on 17 November 1971 and placed in service during December 1971, Accomac began duty in the 12th Naval District sometime in 1972. She served with Naval Region Northwest for the duration of her career.  Stricken from the Navy List 23 March 2012, ex-Accomac awaits disposal.

References

Notes

Sources

External links
 
 

 

Natick-class large harbor tugs
1971 ships
Ships built by Peterson Builders